Back Gate, Arkansas is an unincorporated community in Desha County, Arkansas, United States. The community is located at the junction of U.S. Route 165 and Arkansas Highway 1.

References

Unincorporated communities in Desha County, Arkansas
Unincorporated communities in Arkansas